Kamhi is a surname. Notable people with the surname include:

Katherine Kamhi (born 1964), American actress
Michelle Marder Kamhi (born 1937), American scholar and arts critic
Rafael Moshe Kamhi (1870–1970), Macedonian liaison officer
Victoria Kamhi (1905–1997), Turkish pianist